Sarbak (also Romanized as Sārbak; also known as Sabū, Sar Bug, Sārbūg, and Sārbūk) is a village in Sarbuk Rural District, Sarbuk District, Qasr-e Qand County, Sistan and Baluchestan Province, Iran. At the 2006 census, its population was 2,184, in 428 families.

References 

Populated places in Qasr-e Qand County